Souleymane Doucouré is a Malian politician who served as the Defense Minister of Mali. He was captured and arrested during the 2021 Malian coup d'état.

References

Year of birth missing (living people)
Defense ministers of Mali
Living people
21st-century Malian people